Loh Miaw Gong ((born ) is a Singaporean politician, trade unionist and former political prisoner. She was elected a member of the Legislative Assembly in 1963, which later became the first parliament of Singapore. Contesting as part of the opposition Barisan Sosialis, she was one of the only three women MPs and the only woman opposition member. However, before she could occupy her seat, she was detained under the Internal Security Act.

References 

Prisoners and detainees of Singapore
1930s births
Living people
Barisan Sosialis politicians
Singaporean prisoners and detainees
Singaporean people of Chinese descent
Singaporean trade unionists
Members of the Parliament of Singapore
Members of the Legislative Assembly of Singapore